"Hold Me, Thrill Me, Kiss Me" is a song written by Harry Noble and originally performed by Karen Chandler in 1952. It has been re-recorded several times since then, the most notable covers being by Mel Carter in 1965 and Gloria Estefan in 1994.

Karen Chandler version
The original version was released by Karen Chandler in 1952, released by Coral Records. It first appeared on the US Billboard charts on October 25, 1952 and last appeared on April 11, 1953, peaking at number five on Billboard's chart of "Most Played by Jockeys", number seven on Billboard's chart of "Best Selling Singles", and number nine on Billboard's chart of "Most Played in Juke Boxes".

Mel Carter version

The version most often associated with the song was recorded by Mel Carter, released in 1965 on Imperial. Carter's version spent 15 weeks on the Billboard Hot 100, peaking at number eight, while reaching number one on Billboard's Easy Listening chart, number two on Canada's "RPM Play Sheet", and number four on Canada's CHUM Hit Parade.

Charts

Weekly charts

Year-end charts

Gloria Estefan version

In 1994, Cuban-American singer and songwriter Gloria Estefan released a cover of "Hold Me, Thrill Me, Kiss Me". It was released as the second single (only in Europe and Australia) from her fourth solo album, Hold Me, Thrill Me, Kiss Me (1995). The single also included a new song, "If We Were Lovers" which is the English version of her 1993 hit "Con Los Años Que Me Quedan". "Hold Me, Thrill Me, Kiss Me" peaked at number-one in Spain and Panama. Additionally the single also peaked at number 11 in the UK and number 13 in Scotland.

Critical reception
In an retrospective review, Maryann Scheufele from AXS wrote, "You can not help but move with this slow moving song. She uses every bit of her breath as she sings and she never hesitates to carry a note to completion. Music just dances around Gloria Estefan when she stays in one place to sing." Upon the release, a reviewer from Billboard noted the "thrilling sounds" of the song, complimenting it as "elegant". Chuck Campbell from Knoxville News Sentinel named it a "standout" of the album, "on which Estefan shines through with sincerity". Pan-European magazine Music & Media commented, "Raise the curtains please. Gloria excels on a ballad which is so big that it gets above the clouds, just like radio waves." Phil Shanklin of ReviewsRevues said, "The song is cheesy but Gloria seems aware of this and goes for broke by upping the drama."

Official versions
 Original versions
 Album version — (3:21)

Charts and certifications

Weekly charts

Certifications

Formats and track listings

Other versions
A version was released by American singer Muriel Smith in 1953, which reached No. 3 on the United Kingdom's New Musical Express chart.

Sonny Til and The Orioles released an R&B version in 1953 (Jubilee 5108) 

American songstress Connie Francis included a memorable version on her 1959 album The Exciting Connie Francis.

Greek singer Nana Mouskouri released a version of the song produced by Quincy Jones in 1962.

Dick and Dee Dee released a version of the song on their 1966 album, Songs We've Sung on Shindig.

Shirley Bassey also covered the song on her 1969 album Does Anybody Miss Me.

In 1977, Bobby Vinton released a version of the song on the album The Name Is Love and as a single. Vinton's version reached No. 43 on Billboard's Easy Listening chart.

Hold Me, Thrill Me, Kiss Me was performed by She and Him and is featured on their fourth album Volume 3, in 2013.

Nelson Riddle instrumental orchestral version from the 1961 album "Love Tide".

Influence
The song gave title for albums by Mel Carter (1965), Johnny Mathis (1977), and Gloria Estefan (1994), and was later referenced by U2's 1995 song "Hold Me, Thrill Me, Kiss Me, Kill Me".

Mel Carter's version was featured in the film named after the song, Hold Me, Thrill Me, Kiss Me.

In the 1995 film, To Wong Foo, Thanks for Everything! Julie Newmar, a fragment of Johnny Mathis' recording backs an internal summit point.

See also
List of number-one adult contemporary singles of 1965 (U.S.)

References

External links

Songs about kissing
1952 songs
1952 singles
1965 singles
1994 singles
Mel Carter songs
Dick and Dee Dee songs
Bobby Vinton songs
Gloria Estefan songs
Number-one singles in Spain
Imperial Records singles
Coral Records singles
Epic Records singles